Datuk Mohd Idris Jusi is a Malaysian politician from the Parti Keadilan Rakyat (PKR) of Pakatan Harapan (PH) coalition. He was the Member of Parliament for the Batu Pahat constituency in the state of Johor for one term from 2013 to 2018.

Personal life
He was born in Sungai Dulang, Rengit. He received his primary and religious education at Sekolah Kebangsaan Sg Tongkang and his secondary education at Batu Pahat High School.

Career
Before he served as a member of parliament, he was the Assistant Director of National Civics Bureau or Biro Tata Negara (BTN) after worked as a teacher formerly.

Politics 
In the 2013 general election, he contested for the Batu Pahat parliamentary seat and defeated former Deputy Minister of Education Mohd Puad Zarkashi with a majority of 1,732 votes. He was dropped as candidate by PKR in the 2018 general election.

Election results

References 

Living people
People from Johor
People from Batu Pahat
Malaysian people of Malay descent
Malaysian Muslims
People's Justice Party (Malaysia) politicians
Members of the Dewan Rakyat
21st-century Malaysian politicians
1945 births